Tema West Municipal District is one of the twenty-nine districts in Greater Accra Region, Ghana. Originally it was formerly part of the then-larger Tema Municipal District, which was created from the former Tema District Council, until a small western portion of the district was split off to create Tema West Municipal District on 15 March 2018, which was established by Legislative Instrument (L.I.) 2317; thus the remaining part has been retained as Tema Metropolitan District. The municipality is located in the central part of Greater Accra Region and has Community 2 as its capital town.

Sources
 
 GhanaDistricts.com

References

Districts of Greater Accra Region
2018 establishments in Ghana